Beloye is a rural locality (a village) in Mayskoye Rural Settlement, Vologodsky District, Vologda Oblast, Russia. The population was 1 as of 2002.

Geography 
The distance to Vologda is 10km, to Mayskoye is 7 km. Raskopino, Kuleberevo, Maurino, Akulovo, Dityatyevo, Pribytkovo are the nearest villages, creek Kozma

References 

Rural localities in Vologodsky District